Military Raaj is a 1998 Indian Hindi-language action film directed by Sanjay Sharma, starring Mithun Chakraborty, Aditya Pancholi, Pratibha Sinha, Pooja Bedi, Prem Chopra, Irfan Kamal and Deepak Shirke.

Plot
Major Anand, a patriotic army officer who fights to avoid crimes when there are crime situations, for which he is often blamed by police, stating that the army has no power to fight crimes in civil society and it is the duty of the police. Politicians who are backing up crimes transfer him to a training camp with undisciplined cadets, as the head of the camp. There he trains the cadets to become honest soldiers. In a terrible situation in which police could not keep the peace and crimes have overwhelmed the police, the Government has no other option other than confining the police to barracks and calling the army to take over the security of the country i.e. forming a Military Raaj (Military controlled state).

Cast

Mithun Chakraborty as Major Anand
Aditya Pancholi as Gentleman Cadet Ashfaque
Pratibha Sinha as Priya, Chadalal's daughter
Pooja Bedi as Mathu
Prem Chopra as minister Yashvant Ray
Irfan Kamal	
 Gautam Singh	
Mushtaq Khan as Chadalal servant Ray's, Priya's father
Pramod Moutho as politician Nagishvar Rao 
Siddharth Dhawan		
Deepak Shirke as Swamiji (evil priest)
Vishwajeet Pradhan as Prakash Ray
Mahavir Shah as police inspector
Mac Mohan as police inspector
Achyut Potdar
Janardhan Parab as Politocal party leader
Reshma Singh
Pinky Chinoy

Soundtrack
"Kabhi Hafte Me Do Hafte Me" - Poornima, Bappi Lahiri
"Rim Jhim Rim Jhim (Military Raaj)" - Kumar Sanu, Poornima
" Aage Se Dekha" - Abhijeet
"Balle Balle (Part 1)" - Bappi Lahiri
"Balle Balle (Part 2)" - Bappi Lahiri
"Chinchink Chinak Tu" - N/A
"Gulaabi Hai Gulaabi" - Vinod Rathore, Sadhana Sargam

References

External links
 
 https://archive.today/20110326234929/http://store.nehaflix.com/kmimillit.html

1998 films
1990s Hindi-language films
Mithun's Dream Factory films
Films shot in Ooty
Films scored by Bappi Lahiri
Indian Army in films
Indian action films